Wang Haibing is a Chinese swimmer. At the 2012 Summer Olympics, she competed for the national team in the Women's 4 x 100 metre freestyle relay, finishing in 4th place in the final.

See also
China at the 2012 Summer Olympics - Swimming

References

Year of birth missing (living people)
Living people
Swimmers from Shanghai
Olympic swimmers of China
Swimmers at the 2012 Summer Olympics
Chinese female freestyle swimmers